Time Out Market Lisboa is a food hall located in the Mercado da Ribeira at Cais do Sodré in Lisbon, Portugal.

History 
Time Out Market Lisboa opened in May 2014, and is the first of several planned food hall ventures for Time Out magazine.

The Lisbon market has around 36 restaurants and kiosks selling regional specialities, such as Azeitão sheep's cheese, Alentejo ham, custard tarts from Manteigaria, shellfish and grilled fish, wines and chocolates. Five top portuguese chefs have restaurants here: Alexandre Silva, Miguel Castro e Silva, Marlene Vieira, João Rodrigues and Henrique Sá Pessoa. The original fish, fruit and vegetable market stalls occupy the other half of the landmark building.

Restaurants
The restaurants include:

 Marisqueira Azul
 Cozinha da Felicidade
 Monte Mar
 Café de São Bento
 Sea Me
 Miguel Castro e Silva
 Henrique Sá Pessoa
 Marlene Vieira
 Vincent Farges
 Croqueteria
 O Prego da Peixaria
 Zero Zero
 Confraria
 Gelato Davvero
 Nós é Mais Bolos
 Garrafeira Nacional
 Manteigaria Silva
 Crème de la Crème
 Terra do Bacalhau
 Pap'Açorda
 L'Éclair
 Ground Burger
 Asian Lab
 O Frade
 Recordação de Sintra
 Crush Doughnuts
 Tartine

2016-2019
In 2016, two years after the opening, Time Out Market Lisboa ended the year with a total turnover of 24 million euros and just over three million visitors. In 2018, it reached almost 4 million visitors.

In 2019, the Time Out Market project went international, with the opening of new markets in Miami, New York, Boston and Chicago, in the United States of America, and in Montreal, Canada. Time Out Market Dubai opened in 2021; and new locations are set to open in the future.

Awards 
In 2018, the project was awarded The Hamburg Foodservice Award, in a ceremony that took place in Hamburg, Germany. This international award is one of the most respected and desired European awards in the gastronomy and catering industry, considered the “Oscar” of the sector. Time Out Market Lisboa was honoured as “one of the most visionary concepts in the European foodservice sector”.

Gallery

References

Food halls
Restaurants in Portugal
Lisbon